The marsh frog (Pelophylax ridibundus), a frog in the family Ranidae, is the largest frog native to Europe.

Marsh frog may also refer to:

 Barking marsh frog (Limnodynastes fletcheri), a frog in the family Myobatrachidae native to southeastern Australia
 Greek marsh frog (Pelophylax kurtmuelleri), a frog in the family Ranidae found in Greece, Albania, Montenegro, and Serbia
 Montane marsh frog (Poyntonia paludicola), a frog in the family Pyxicephalidae endemic to Western Cape, South Africa
 Spotted marsh frog (Limnodynastes tasmaniensis), a frog in the family Myobatrachidae native to southeastern Australia including Tasmania
 Striped marsh frog (Limnodynastes peronii), a frog in the family Myobatrachidae native to coastal eastern Australia
 Western marsh frog (Heleioporus barycragus), a frog in the family Myobatrachidae endemic to Australia